Homer Pigeon is a Walter Lantz cartoon animal character, who made his first appearance in the cartoon "Pigeon Patrol", in 1942. His final appearance was in 1964, in The Woody Woodpecker Show episode "Spook-A-Nanny".

The character's voice was based on Red Skelton's rube character, Clem Kadiddlehopper.

List of appearances
Pigeon Patrol (08/03/1942)
Swing Your Partner (04/26/1943)
The Auto-Lite Sparkys (??/??/1951)
Pigeon Holed (01/16/1956)
Spook-A-Nanny (10/??/1964)

Comics 
 New Funnies (1942) (Dell)
 Walter Lantz New Funnies (1946) (Dell)
 Walter Lantz Andy Panda (1952) (Dell)
 Walter Lantz Woody Woodpecker (1952) (Dell)
 Woody Woodpecker's Back to School (1952) (Dell)
 Woody Woodpecker's Country Fair (1956) (Dell)
 Golden Comics Digest (1969) (Gold Key)
 Walter Lantz Andy Panda (1973) (Gold Key)

See also
List of Walter Lantz cartoons
List of Walter Lantz cartoon characters

References

External links 
 
 The Walter Lantz-o-Pedia
Homer Pigeon at Don Markstein's Toonopedia. Archived from the original on April 13, 2013.

Anthropomorphic birds
Fictional doves and pigeons
Universal Pictures cartoons and characters
Walter Lantz Productions shorts
Film characters introduced in 1942
Walter Lantz Productions cartoons and characters